Elnora Daugherty Farm is a historic home and farm and national historic district located at Sand Creek Township, Bartholomew County, Indiana.  It encompasses six contributing buildings, one contributing site (a gasoline pump) and one contributing object (a row of Silver Maple trees).  The house was built in 1892, and is a -story, Queen Anne-style frame dwelling.  Also on the property are the contributing traverse-frame barn (c. 1890), wagon shed (c. 1900), utility building (c. 1920), and storage shed (c. 1920).

It was listed on the National Register of Historic Places in 1992.

References

Farms on the National Register of Historic Places in Indiana
Historic districts on the National Register of Historic Places in Indiana
Queen Anne architecture in Indiana
Houses completed in 1892
Buildings and structures in Bartholomew County, Indiana
National Register of Historic Places in Bartholomew County, Indiana